Mario Goodrich (born January 12, 2000) is an American football cornerback for the Philadelphia Eagles of the National Football League (NFL). He played college football at Clemson, winning a national championship in 2018.

Early years
Goodrich attended Lee's Summit West High School in Lee's Summit, Missouri. He played cornerback and wide receiver in high school. During his career he had 140 tackles, 11 interceptions on defense and 38 receptions for 641 yards on offense with 22 total touchdowns. He originally committed to the University of Nebraska to play college football before switching to Clemson University.

College career
Goodrich played in 14 games as a true freshman at Clemson in 2018, recording six tackles. In 2019 he played in 13 games and had seven tackles and one interceptions. In 2020 he started four of eight games, recording 13 tackles and two interceptions. As a senior in 2021, he had 42 tackles, two interceptions and a touchdown in 12 starts. He was named the MVP of the 2021 Cheez-It Bowl in his final collegiate game.

College statistics

Professional career

After going unselected in the 2022 NFL Draft, Goodrich was signed by the Philadelphia Eagles as an undrafted free agent on April 30. He was waived on August 30, 2022, and signed to the practice squad the next day.

References

External links
 Philadelphia Eagles bio
Clemson Tigers bio

2000 births
Living people
Players of American football from Kansas City, Missouri
American football cornerbacks
Clemson Tigers football players
Philadelphia Eagles players